USS William Charette (DDG-130) is a planned  guided missile destroyer of the United States Navy, the 80th overall for the class. She will be named in honor of Master Chief William R. Charette, a Korean War veteran and recipient of the Medal of Honor. William Charette will be the fifth ship of the Flight III series.

References

 

Arleigh Burke-class destroyers
Proposed ships of the United States Navy